The Local Government Act 2010 (c. 35) is an Act of the Parliament of the United Kingdom. It revokes structural change orders that would have established Exeter and Norwich as unitary authorities and prevents the implementation of the Suffolk unitary proposals.

The implementation orders were blocked by a High Court ruling, but Eric Pickles, Secretary of State for Communities and Local Government, said the "zombie proposals" still theoretically existed and had to be killed off. The Bill was introduced in the House of Lords on 26 May 2010. The Bill's second reading was blocked following Lord Howarth's argument that it constituted a hybrid bill. It ultimately passed third reading in Lords on 5 October.

In favour of the Bill, the Government said that halting the plan would save £40 million in reorganisation costs. Lord McKenzie of Luton, a member of the opposition Labour Party, said that the bill would "shut out Exeter and Norwich from the opportunity to become unitary councils" in "an arrogant, dictatorial and brutal way".

References

External links
Local Government Bill – official page on UK Parliament website

United Kingdom Acts of Parliament 2010
Local government legislation in England and Wales